Uppada Jamdani Sari is a  silk sari style woven in Uppada of East Godavari district in the Indian state of Andhra Pradesh. It was registered as one of the geographical indication from Andhra Pradesh by Geographical Indications of Goods (Registration and Protection) Act, 1999. Uppada Jamdani saris are known for their light weight.

Etymology 
The name Jamdani in the Uppada Jamdani Sari is a Persian terminology, in which Jam means flower and Dani means Vase.

History 
Jamdani style of weaving is originated in Bangladesh. In 18th Century, It was brought to south and in Uppada village of East Godavari district, Andhra Pradesh, India Jamdani style of weaving recreated with a local resonance. The Jamdani style weaving was as old as 300 years. In 1972, Uppada weavers were recognized by Govt. of India with President's award.

Fabric of Jamdani Saree 
The Uppada Jamdani Saree is a beautiful textile that has been weaved in South India for centuries. The fabric has a silk-like texture and is lightweight, making it perfect for designing sarees, gowns, scarves, etc. The history behind the Uppada fabric can be traced back to the Jamdani weaving technique developed in Bengal.

Weave 
Uppada Jamdani saree weaving takes nearly 10 – 60 days time for which at least 2-3 weavers has to spend 10 hours of their day. Weavers uses pure lace (silver zari often dipped in melted gold) and also finest silk of Bengaluru area. Weaving of saree involves, laying out its design, interweaving silk threads, looming, etc., There are around 3000 looms producing Jamdani sarees in and around Uppada and kothapalli area.

The sari 
Around forty percent of the local weavers are women. To make a sari, it takes a week to a fortnight which consists of cotton body with silk pallu and all completely handwoven. The weavers design in such a way that it can be folded and fits in a matchbox. Different designs include geometric, flowers, leaves, etc. Speciality of Jamdani saree is that it gets design on both the sides and is much less weight than that of Kanchi and Dharmavaram brands.

See also 
Ilkal saree
Navalgund Durries
Mysore silk
List of Geographical Indications in India
Bengali Sarees

References 

Saris
Culture of Andhra Pradesh
Geographical indications in Andhra Pradesh